Fares Karam  (born 21 January 1973) is a Lebanese singer who specializes in the Dabke style and Lebanese music in general. He is known for the songs "Retani" (I wish), "El-Tannoura" (The Skirt), "Shefta" (I Saw Her) and "Neswanji" (womanizer). Throughout his career, he has participated in a large number of concerts, public celebrations and festivals all over Lebanon. Karam has also toured the Arab World, UK, South America, United States, Europe, Australia and Canada.

Biography
Karam was born in Jezzine, in Southern Lebanon to a Maronite family. His father was a farmer and his mother worked as a teacher in the local school for their village. He has one sister, Madonna, with whom he maintains a very close relationship. Karam grew up in the mountainous areas of Lebanon, and later attributed his song "Jabali" to this experience.

Fares Karam rose to the limelight in the 1990s when he participated in the 1996 series of the Lebanese talent show Studio El Fan and received the gold medal. He signed with Rotana Records. His musical style is linked more closely to Dabke. His live band plays many of his songs with a large tabl (drum).

Personal life
Karam married Hiba Aziz, a teacher from Jezzine, in 2020.

Discography

Albums 
 Chlonn (1998)
 Janen (2002)
 Aktar Min Rohi (2003)
 Dakeelo (2004)
 W'edni (2005)
 Yo' Borni (2007)
 El Hamdlilah (2010)
 Fares Karam 2013 (2013)
 44:36 (2018)

Singles
 Aal Tayib (2015)
 Bala Hob Bala Bateekh (2016)
 Mnamnam (2016)
 Aa Mawedna Walla Shou (2022)
 Amarjee (2022)

References

External links
 

1973 births
Living people
People from Jezzine
20th-century Lebanese male singers
Lebanese Christians
People from South Lebanon
Rotana Records artists
Lebanese pop singers
21st-century Lebanese male singers